Margaret Press (born 1946/1947) is a forensic genealogist and an author of both true crime and mystery novels. She is also known for co-founding the DNA Doe Project with Colleen M. Fitzpatrick.

Education

Press has a bachelor's degree in linguistics from the University of California at Berkeley and a Doctoral degree in linguistics from the University of California at Los Angeles.

Career

Press had a career in computer programming when she began helping adoptees find family members using DNA databases. When she retired from programming she came upon the idea of using the same method to try to identify persons who were deceased and listed as "Doe's" by authorities. She became known as a forensic genealogist through this work.

Press is an author of both fiction and non-fiction crime books. She has also had a career in speech and language consulting. She retired from computer programming in 2015 and relocated from Salem, Massachusetts to Sebastopol, California to live near family. As a hobby, Press had begun working in genetic genealogy in 2007, helping friends and acquaintances find relatives, as well as helping adoptees find their biological parents. Inspired by Sue Grafton's novel "Q" Is for Quarry, about a Jane Doe, Press hoped to use genetic genealogy to also identify unidentified homicide victims.

Published works
 Press, Margaret L. Elegy for a Thief: A Detective Sergeant Gabriel Dunn Mystery. New York: Carroll & Graf, 1993. Print. 
 Press, Margaret L. Requiem for a Postman. New York: Carroll & Graf Publishers, 1992. 
 Press, Margaret L, and Joan N. Pinkham. Counterpoint: A Murder in Massachusetts Bay. Omaha, Neb: Addicus Books, 1996. 
 Press, Margaret L and Joan N. Pinkham. A Scream on the Water: A True Story of Murder in Salem. New York, NY: St. Martin's Paperbacks, 1997.

References

American women novelists
University of California, Berkeley alumni
University of California, Los Angeles alumni
American mystery writers
Genetic genealogists
American women non-fiction writers
American non-fiction crime writers
Year of birth missing (living people)
Living people
21st-century American women writers

External links
her website containing the Chemehuevi language data collected for her dissertation